Seeligerite is a rare complex lead chlorate iodate mineral with formula: Pb3Cl3(IO3)O. It is a yellow mineral crystallizing in the orthorhombic system. It has perfect to good cleavage in two directions and a quite high specific gravity of 6.83 due to the lead content. It is translucent to transparent with refractive indices of nα=2.120 nβ=2.320 nγ=2.320.

It was first reported in 1971 from the Casucha Mine, Sierra Gorda, Antofagasta Region, Chile.

References

Lead minerals
Oxide minerals
Iodates
Orthorhombic minerals
Minerals in space group 20